"The Mad Scientist" is a song by American emcee Large Professor, released on April 2, 1996, as the first single from his debut album The LP; the album was shelved by Geffen Records before eventually being released in 2009. The song contains a sample of "Dune Part II: Sandworms" by David Matthews.

Track listing

12" single
A-side
"The Mad Scientist" (Street Version)
"The Mad Scientist" (Clean)
"The Mad Scientist" (Instrumental)

B-side
"Spacey" (Street Version)
"Spacey" (Clean)
"Listen (Blast Off)"

Charts

References

1995 songs
1996 debut singles
Geffen Records singles
Large Professor songs
Song recordings produced by Large Professor
Songs written by Large Professor